The Te Atatu Roosters is a rugby league club based in Te Atatū, New Zealand. They participate in the Auckland Rugby League competition. They currently have 25 teams across schoolboy, junior and senior grades. The Roosters premier team began the 2022 season in the Fox Memorial Shield competition.

Home ground
The Roosters play at the council owned Jack Colvin Park located on the Te Atatū Peninsula, next to the North Western Motorway. Junior teams also play at Te Atatū South Park.

History 
The Te Atatū club was founded in 1955 after the opening of the North-Western motorway led to suburban growth in the Te Atatū area. The first team was a 7-aside team formed to represent Te Atatū North and South. They initially had to wear Glenora jerseys (who were a club based in Glen Eden) and their first ever game was against Wesley at Fowlds Park. The first training area was in a cow paddock on Edmonton Rd, before they were later able to move to Ramlea Park.

In 1961 Te Atatū won their first schoolboy championship in their Te Atatū colours. In 1960–61 Te Atatū Peninsula Park was developed on Neil Avenue and in 1965 they fielded their first senior side in the Senior B grade. The ground is still commonly referred to as 'Neil Ave'.

In the late 1960s work began on the current club rooms on Toru Avenue. They were built on Crown (council) land arranged with Waitematā Mayor Jack Colvin after 3 club members were elected to the WCC Parks Committee. However, before the club rooms could be built the land needed to be prepared. The land was in such poor condition that no other clubs had bothered applying for it, and life member Ken Pitman described the task of preparing it thus: "What a mess, over six acres of swamp, gorse and pine trees, five feet thick. Well we were all enthusiastic and silly enough to attempt the impossible. We chopped, scrounged, swore, drank and burned our way through the lot". The council also helped by putting a culvert under the motorway and realigned the creek which ran through the park. Eventually the playing fields were established and work could begin on the club rooms.

The club rooms took over 6 years to complete with the foundation stone being laid on 17 December 1962, with the official opening on 19 April 1969 by MP Martin Finlay. Just as the land was prepared solely by club members, so to was the club room built completely by members including Ken Pitman, Tom Hetherington, Ted Quedely, Eric Draper, Ernie Rainbow, Morrie Ramsey, Peter and Bis Pitman, Buddy Jones, Harry McWilliams, Jim Denyer, Gordon McCarten, Pat Fairweather, Don McMeekin, Murray Hill and Ian Pattulo.

By the 1970s Te Atatū were becoming more competitive on the field at senior level and completed wins over all of the top clubs over a period of time, including Ellerslie Eagles, Mt Albert Lions, Glenora Bears, Richmond Bulldogs and Ponsonby Ponies.  At this time the club also began producing NZ international quality players such as Dennis Williams who aged only 18 famously scored a brilliant individual try with his first touch of the ball in his debut test versus Great Britain, along with John Smith and John Wilson. In 1973 they won the Senior Competition and the Phelan Shield. In the same year they played the first ever Australian Aboriginal rugby league team in a pre season game, losing 13–17.

Around this time other branches of the club were formed at Ranui (which later led to the formation of the Waitemata Seagulls), and Massey. Teams playing at Moire Park in Massey were known as Te Atatū Massey. The nickname 'Roosters' was adopted along with the Eastern Suburbs (now Sydney Roosters) style jersey. In 1976 they turned 21 yrs old and celebrated with a ball at the Mandalay in the city. In 1979 club members looking for a summer activity to continue bonding and to develop player skills formed the Te Atatū Roosters Softball Club. The softball club has since relocated to the Massey Rugby Club and plays at Rosedale Park on Auckland's North Shore, but has retained the name Roosters Softball Club.

In the 1980s the club finally began experiencing the success on the field they had sought after for many years. In 1986 they were runners up in the Fox Memorial Shield to Mt Albert losing 31-4 but weeks later were crowned National Club Champions after defeating the same opposition 36-10. Then in 1988 they won the Fox Memorial Shield beating local rivals Glenora 22–16 in the final at Carlaw Park and a month later won the National Club title for the second time by again defeating Glenora at Eden Park as curtain-raiser to the Kiwis – Kangaroo World Cup final.

In 2016 Te Atatū formed their first women's premier team. They played six seasons and won the 2nd division title twice (2016 and 2019). They are not fielding a women's team in 2022 however.

Titles 

Te Atatu's first ever senior trophy was the Gillette Cup in 1968. They won it again in 1974. Their other trophies early in their existence were in the Sharman Cup where they won it in 1970, 1973, 1974, 1976 and 1978.

Te Atatu had a historic year in 1986 when they won the Rukutai Shield for winning the minor premiership and making the Fox Memorial grand final (both for the first time) where they lost to the Mt Albert Lions 31–4. A month later they had revenge when they beat the Lions by 36–10 to claim their first National Club title at Carlaw Park, defeating Randwick and Upper Hutt along the way.

Te Atatu finally won the coveted Fox Memorial Shield, awarded to the Auckland club champions in 1988 with a win over local rivals the Glenora Bears.  They also went on to win the Lion Red National Club Final against Glenora at Eden Park 18–8 in the same year.  The match was televised live as it was the curtain-raiser to the New Zealand – Australia Rugby League World Cup final which Australia went on to win 25–12 in front of 45,363 spectators.

In 1990 they again made the Fox Memorial final but lost to a Tawera Nikau inspired Otahuhu Leopards. In 1993 they made the Fox Memorial final for the 4th time but were again defeated by the Northcote Tigers 29–10.

In 2005 the Roosters celebrated their 50th Jubilee. In 2007 Te Atatu won the Roope Rooster (which by this time had become a trophy the winning team defended on their home ground). They defeated Mt Albert to win it and defended it for 3 matches before losing it to the Richmond Bulldogs.

In 2010 they finished 4th at the end of the regular season in the Fox Memorial and defeated 3rd placed Howick in the minor final, before losing to Otahuhu in preliminary final. The 2011 to 2014 seasons were largely uneventful, spent in the lower divisions. The 2014 season was arguably one of the worst in the club's history with just 2 wins from 18 games, both over the last placed Manukau Magpies.

The club then rebuilt in 2015 by appointing Revell Neil and bringing in many new players to the premier team. This saw a massive reversal in results and over the 2015 and 2016 seasons they won a remarkable 35 games, with 2 draws and just 3 losses. In 2015 they had their 60th Jubilee which featured a celebratory match with local rivals Glenora and was won by Te Atatu 38–28. They also won the Phelan Shield in this time. In 2016 they won the Phelan Shield again along with promotion back to the Fox Memorial when they beat the Bay Roskill Vikings 31–22 in the Sharman Cup final. In 2017 they were competitive in many matches but failed to convert this into wins. They were relegated back to the Sharman Cup and in 2018 were forced to rebuild after losing many of their players to other teams. Former Te Atatu player Lawrence Tagaloa was appointed head coach. They finished the season with a 7–7 record and lost to New Lynn in the Sharman Cup championship final. 2019 saw another change with new coaches (Keith Hanley and Phil Gordon) appointed and many new additions to the team. The 2022 season saw Phil Gordan in charge again as head coach after he had assumed sole responsibility in 2021. Te Atatu had one of their better seasons for over a decade and qualified 3rd in section 2 which included 10 sides with a 7 win, 2 loss record. They then thrashed Mangere East 62-6 in the quarterfinal before losing to eventual finalists Glenora 26-12.

Current Season and Season Finishing Positions

Men's Season Records 2003 + 2009-2022

Women's Season Records

Notable Past Players 
Te Atatu's first Kiwi International was Dennis Williams in 1971. He went on to play 31 tests for New Zealand. The majority of the NZ representatives were to come from the late 1980s and early 1990s when the club experienced considerable success on the field With the likes of Peter Brown, Mark Elia, Mark Horo, Ron O'Regan, Dean Orr, and Sam Panapa in the side. In the early 1990s brothers Henry and Robbie Paul represented the Kiwi's though Robbie moved to play professionally in England at a young age and due to the difficulty for players from England being able to return to New Zealand or Australia for tests he did not represent New Zealand as many times as he would undoubtedly have. His brother Henry Paul also moved to play professionally in England and he later switched codes representing England in rugby union, and in Rugby Sevens. He was not the only Te Atatu Rooster to represent another country in Rugby Union. Shontayne Hape switched codes and was selected for the full English international side who he represented 13 times, and more recently James O'Connor who was a Te Atatu Schoolboy was selected for the Wallabies, the Australia national rugby union team.

NZ Representatives
Kiwis

Peter Brown (16 tests)
Mark Elia (37 tests)
Shontayne Hape (14 tests)
Mark Horo (16 tests)
Suaia Matagi (1 test)
Ron O'Regan (8 tests)
Dean Orr (1 test)
Sam Panapa (8 tests)
Henry Paul (24 tests)
Robbie Paul (29 tests)
John Smith (12 tests)
Dennis Williams (31 tests)
John Wilson (2 tests)

NZ Maori

David Bailey
Mark Horo
Ron O'Regan
Terry O'Shea
Dennis Williams
John Smith
John Wilson

Junior Kiwis

Taime Tagaloa
Henry Paul (c)

NZ Under 19s

Terry O'Shea
Mark Elia

NZ Secondary Schools

Shontayne Hape

NZ Under 16s

Dean Orr
Benjamen Vai

NZ Universities

Graeme Murdoch (5 tests)

New Zealand Defence Force
Parata Ainsley
Beufa Brown
Peter Lincoln
Trevor Baker

Auckland Representative Teams
Auckland

David Bailey
Allen Cunningham
Shane Horo
Michael Kini
Carl Magatogia
Neville Ramsey
Phil Robards
Iva Ropati
Peter Ropati
Wayne Robertson
Mike Smith
Jim Denyer

New Zealand Warriors

Mark Horo (36 games)
Iva Ropati (7 games)
David Bailey (3 games)
Patrick Ah Van (54 games)
Shontayne Hape (28 games)
Suaia Matagi (36 games)
Isaiah Papali'i*

NZ Warriors U20s

Peter Mills (2009)
Zensei Inu (2010)
Stephen Shennan (2011)

NRL
Canterbury Bulldogs

Mark Elia (9 games)

Gold Coast Titans

Paterika Vaivai (10 games)
Newcastle Knights

Paterika Vaivai (6 games)
Sydney Roosters

Suaia Matagi (7 games)

Parramatta Eels

Mark Horo (62 games)
Isaiah Papali'i (45 games)
Iva Ropati (4 games)
Api Pewhairangi (4 games)
Suaia Matagi (35 games)

Penrith Panthers

Suaia Matagi (23 games)

Western Suburbs

Mark Horo

Super League/England
Bradford Bulls

Patrick Ah Van (28 games)
Robbie Paul (241 games)
Shontayne Hape (136 games)

Castleford Tigers

Shane Horo (18 games)

Featherstone Rovers

Iva Ropati

Halifax R.L.F.C.

Peter Brown
Mark Elia

Huddersfield Giants

Suaia Matagi (28 games)
Robbie Paul (52 games)

Hunslet

Peter Brown

Kent Invicta

Mark Elia (34 games)

Leeds

Peter Brown

Leigh Centurions

Peter Brown
Shane Horo
Peter Ropati
Robbie Paul (38 games)

Oldham RLFC

Iva Ropati

Rochdale Hornets

David Bailey

Salford Giants

Peter Brown (16 games)
Robbie Paul (27 games)
Mark Horo (20 games)
Sam Panapa (71 games)

Sheffield Eagles

Sam Panapa (38 games)

St Helens R.F.C.

Mark Elia (70 games)
Iva Ropati

Wigan

Sam Panapa (119 games)

Wakefield Trinity

David Bailey

Widnes Vikings

Patrick Ah Van (118 games)
Mark Elia

Harlequins

Robbie Paul (10 games)

International Rugby League and Rugby Union
Australia

James O'Connor (44 tests)

England

Henry Paul (6 tests)
Shontayne Hape (13 tests)

Romania

Stephen Shennan(17 tests)*

Samoa

Mark Elia (2 tests)
Sam Panapa (2 tests)
Patrick Ah Van (1 test)
Suaia Matagi (7 tests)
Malo Solomona (5 tests)

Fiji

Fred Robarts (3 tests)

Tokelau

Sam Panapa

Video of Games and Interviews

Men's Premiers Matches
1988 v Glenora Bears (22-16) Fox Memorial Grand Final
2011 v East Coast Bays Barricudas Sharman Cup, 26 March (30-10) Full Match
2011 v Manukau Magpies Sharman Cup R7 (26-4) Edited Footage
2014 v East Coast Bays Barricudas Sharman Cup (12-54) Full Match
2016 v Northern Brothers Sharman Cup R7 (28-12) Full Match
2016 v Ellerslie Eagles (20-12) Sharman Cup Highlights
2016 v Ellerslie Eagles 27 August (42-12) Sharman Cup Semi Final Full Match
2017 v Mt Albert Lions Fox Memorial (6-38) 1st Half2nd Half
2017 v Northcote Tigers Fox Memorial (18-22)1st Half2nd Half
2017 v Richmond Bulldogs Fox Memorial (15-18) Full Match
2018 v Manukau Magpies Sharman Cup R6 (36-14) 1st Half 2nd Half
2018 v New Lynn Stags Sharman Cup Major Semifinal (24-29) Major Semi Final
2019 v Manukau Magpies Fox Qualifying Championship R1 (34-18) Full Match Edited
2019 v Hibiscus Coast Raiders Fox Qualifying Championship R2 (32-34) Full Match Edited
2019 v Ellerslie Eagles Fox Qualifying Championship R4 (22-12) 1st Half 2nd Half
2019 v Waitemata Seagulls Fox Qualifying Championship R5 (52-18) Full Match Edited
2019 v Pukekohe Pythons Fox Qualifying Championship R6 (24-14) Full Match Edited
2019 v Ponsonby Ponies Fox Qualifying Championship R7 (44-12) Full Match Edited
2019 v Papakura Sea Eagles Fox Memorial Championship R5 (22-28) 1st Half 2nd Half
2019 v Papakura Sea Eagles Fox Memorial Championship Final (8-38) Full Match
2020 v Mangere East Fox Memorial R2 (40-18) 1st Half 2nd Half
2020 v Otahuhu Leopards Fox Memorial R6 (18-22) Full Match
2021 v Mt Albert Lions Fox Memorial R5 (24-26) Full Match
2021 v Hibiscus Coast Fox Memorial Championship R3 (18-22) 1st Half 2nd Half
2021 v Manukau Magpies Fox Memorial Championship R7 (24-26)  2nd Half

Men's Premiers Nines Tournament Matches
2018 ARL Nines v Mt Albert Lions Pool Match (0-34) Full Match
2018 ARL Nines v Waitemata Seagulls Pool Match (10-8) Full Match
2019 ARL Nines v Marist Saints Pool Match (0-10) Full Match
2019 ARL Nines v Mangere East Hawks Pool Match (8-24) Full Match
2019 ARL Nines v Manurewa Marlins Plate Semi Final (12-20) Full Match

Men's Premiers Interviews and Preseason
2014 Pre Season Training Wainamu Dunes
2015 Interview with Dennis Williams and Stephen Quedley TVJ 51 Roosters
2016 Interview with captain Kyle Neal Post Sharman Cup Grand Final win

Women's Premiers
2017 Women's Premiers v Pt Chevalier Pirates Pennant Grand Final (24-14) Full Match
2019 Women's Premiers v Manukau Magpies Championship Grand Final (10-8) 1st Half 2nd Half
2020 Women's Premiers v Otara Scorpions Full Match
2021 Women's Premiers v Ponsonby Ponies R9 (6-60) 1st Half 2nd Half

Women's Premiers Interviews
2020 Women's Interviews with players from The Coconet TV 

Men's Premier 1st (Reserve Grade)
2016 Premier 1st v Northern Brothers Full Match
2019 Premier 1st v Hibiscus Coast (50-22) Full Match
2019 Premier 1st Grand Final v Bay Roskill (22-23) Full Match
2020 Premier 1st v Mangere East R2 (64-6) Full Match
2020 Premier 1st v Otahuhu Leopards Fox Memorial R6 (17-16) Full Match
2020 Premier 1st v Manukau (28-18) Full Match
2021 Premier 1st v Marist Saints R6 (24-34) Full Match
2021 Premier 1st v Hibiscus Coast (30-12) Full Match

Other recordings
2017 Kiwi Ferns (Lilieta Maumau and Maitua Feterika) shopping at K-Mart in Henderson for toys for the club room play group.
2021 Te Atatū women's players Karli Hansen (Gold Coast Titans) and Katelyn Vaha’akolo (Newcastle Knights), the first Te Atatū women players to gain contracts to play in the NRL Women’s competition. They are interviewed for Māori TV.

References

External links
Te Atatu Roosters Website
Te Atatu Roosters Facebook Page
Te Atatu Roosters Instagram Page
Auckland Rugby League

 
Auckland rugby league clubs
Rugby clubs established in 1955
1955 establishments in New Zealand
Sport in West Auckland, New Zealand